Suorva or Suorvadammen ("the Suorva Dam") is a small settlement situated at the southern parts of Akkajaure, in Stora Sjöfallet National Park, Sweden. The settlement can be reached by car (and bus, from Gällivare). It consists of a few houses and a dam operated by Vattenfall, which regulates the flow to the hydroelectric plant in Vietas located about 5 kilometers downstream. The road over the dam is normally open for hikers (not cars) and makes for a possible route into the northern parts of Sarek National Park which does not require using a boat.

References

Lapland (Sweden)
Populated places in Norrbotten County
Hydroelectric power stations in Sweden
Vattenfall
Gällivare Municipality